The Queen of Spades is a 1949 British fantasy-horror film based on the 1834 short story of the same name by Alexander Pushkin. It stars Anton Walbrook, Edith Evans and Yvonne Mitchell. Evans and Mitchell were better known at the time as stage actors; this film was their cinematic debut.

Plot
Captain Herman Suvorin is a Russian officer of the engineers in St Petersburg in 1806. He constantly watches the other officers gamble at faro, but never plays himself because he is averse to the risk of losing his money.

Herman overhears gossip among several military officers about the aging Countess Ranevskaya, who knows the secret of winning at cards and won a large sum of money after selling her soul, several decades earlier in her youth. Later Herman purchases a book titled The Strange Secrets of the Count de Saint Germain purporting to tell the true stories of people who sold their souls for wealth, power or influence. One chapter of the book describes how in 1746 a "Countess R***" obtained the secret from the count and subsequently won a fortune from gambling. The countess had to promise not to disclose the secret. Herman assumes "Countess R***" is Countess Ranevskaya.

The countess (now very elderly) has a young ward, Lizavyeta Ivanovna. Andrei, a military officer of noble birth and a friend of Herman, encounters Lizavyeta in a bird market and decides to become her suitor. At the same time, Herman tries to seduce Lizavyeta with love letters in order to persuade her to let him into the countess's house. Andrei discovers Herman's advances, breaks off their friendship and warns Lizavyeta that Herman is dangerous. Lizavyeta rejects Andrei's warning.

Herman gains access to the house and accosts the countess, demanding the secret. He offers to assume her sin in exchange. He repeats his demands, but she does not speak. He draws a pistol and threatens her, and the old lady dies of fright. Herman then flees to the apartment of Lizavyeta in the same building. There he confesses to frightening the countess to death. He defends himself by saying that the pistol was not loaded. He escapes from the house with the aid of Lizavyeta, who is disgusted to learn that his professions of love were a mask for greed.

Herman attends the funeral of the countess, and is terrified to see the deceased open her eyes in the coffin and look at him. Later that night, Herman reads a chapter of his book titled The Dead Will Give Up Their Secrets. Subsequently, the ghost of the countess visits his apartment. The ghost names the secret of the three cards (three, seven, ace), but orders him to marry Lizavyeta as a condition. The next day Herman tries to reconcile with Lizavyeta, but she again rejects him.

Herman takes his entire savings to a gaming salon. When he arrives, Andrei challenges him to a duel. Herman accepts on condition that Andrei play a hand of faro with him; Andrei accepts. Herman bets all his savings on the three of spades and wins. Herman and Andrei agree on a second round, which Herman wins on the seven of spades. A third round is played. Herman spots the ace of spades in his hand in front of the queen of spades. Herman places his selected card face down on the table and bets on the ace—but when cards are shown, he finds he has bet on the queen of spades and loses everything. Showing compassion, Andrei escorts a very distraught Herman from the gambling table, who mumbles repeatedly "three, seven, ace … three, seven, queen".

Lizavyeta and Andrei celebrate their future happiness together by fulfilling Lizavyeta's dream of purchasing every bird in the bird market and setting them all free.

Cast
Anton Walbrook as Captain Herman Suvorin
Edith Evans as Countess Ranevskaya
Yvonne Mitchell as Lizavetta Ivanova
Ronald Howard as Andrei
Mary Jerrold as Old Varvarushka
Anthony Dawson as Fyodor
Miles Malleson as Tchybukin
Michael Medwin as Hovaisky
Athene Seyler as Princess Ivashin
Ivor Barnard as Bookseller
Aubrey Mallalieu as Fedya
Maroussia Dimitrevitch as Gypsy singer
Violetta Elvin as Gypsy dancer
Pauline Tennant as young Countess Ranevskaya
Hay Petrie as Herman's servant (final film)
Aubrey Woods as Dimitri

Production

The screenplay was adapted from a short story of the same name by Alexander Pushkin, with a script written by Arthur Boys and Rodney Ackland. Ackland was also originally the film's director, before disagreements with producer Anatole de Grunwald and star Walbrook, caused him to be replaced at a few days notice by Thorold Dickinson, who also rewrote sections of the script.

The film was shot at Welwyn Studios in Welwyn Garden City, Hertfordshire, using sets created by William Kellner, from original designs by Oliver Messel. It was nominated for a BAFTA Award for Best British Film and was entered into the 1949 Cannes Film Festival.

Release
The Queen of Spades was once considered lost, but was rediscovered and later re-released in British cinemas on 26 December 2009. It was released on Region 2 DVD in January 2010.

Reception

Writing in 1949, The New York Times Bosley Crowther noted "a most beautifully accomplished cast, exquisite baroque production and staging of a tense and startling sort. If it's romantic shivers you're wanting, this is undoubtedly your film."

Wes Anderson ranked it as the sixth best British film. Martin Scorsese has described Thorold Dickinson as an underrated director, saying of The Queen of Spades that "this stunning film is one of the few true classics of supernatural cinema." Dennis Schwartz of Ozus' World Movie Reviews rated the film an A−, calling it "A masterfully filmed surreal atmospheric supernatural tale".

References

External links
 
 

1949 films
1949 horror films
1940s fantasy films
British fantasy films
British historical horror films
1940s historical films
British black-and-white films
Films set in Russia
Films set in the 1800s
Films about gambling
1940s ghost films
Films based on The Queen of Spades
Films directed by Thorold Dickinson
Films produced by Anatole de Grunwald
Films shot at Welwyn Studios
Period horror films
British ghost films
1940s English-language films
1940s British films